Thiouric acid, more accurately called 6-thiouric acid, is a main inactive metabolite of the immunosuppressive drugs azathioprine, mercaptopurine and tioguanine.

References

Uric acid
Thiocarbonyl compounds